Lucien Guillier (19 December 1926 – 4 December 2019) was a French discus thrower and shot putter who competed in the 1952 Summer Olympics.

References

1926 births
2019 deaths
French male discus throwers
French male shot putters
Olympic athletes of France
Athletes (track and field) at the 1952 Summer Olympics